Candidly Nicole is an American scripted comedic faux-reality television series starring Nicole Richie. The series premiered on July 17, 2014, on VH1. Richie talks about her humorous daily adventures and her views on everything from style to relationships.

The series received its UK premiere on Sunday 28 February 2016 on ITVBe.

Cast

Main cast members 

 Nicole Richie

Guest stars 

 Kelly Oxford
 Sofia Richie
 Jensen Karp
 Lionel Richie
 Benji Madden
 Erin Foster
 Ryan Seacrest
 Rashida Jones

Series overview

Episodes

Season 1 (2014)

Season 2 (2015)

References

2010s American reality television series
2014 American television series debuts
English-language television shows
VH1 original programming
2015 American television series endings
Television series by Telepictures
Television series by Warner Bros. Television Studios